Jean-Luc Couchard (born 14 July 1969) is a Belgian actor.

Theater

Filmography

External links 
 

1969 births
Living people
People from Limbourg
20th-century French male actors
21st-century Belgian male actors
Belgian male film actors